South Egan Range Wilderness is a  wilderness area in Lincoln, White Pine, and Nye Counties in the U.S. state of Nevada.  Located in the Egan Range approximately two miles east of the town of Lund, the Wilderness was created by the "White Pine County Conservation, Recreation and Development Act of 2006" and is administered by the U.S. Bureau of Land Management.

The South Egan Range Wilderness protects the rugged, bristlecone pine-studded mountain spine running nearly the entire length of the White River Valley.

In the southern third of the Wilderness, Long Valley forms an open bowl between high mountain ridges. Rolling hills of pinyon and juniper forests and deep canyons of riparian vegetation round out the ecological and scenic diversity.

Wildlife
The South Egan Range Wilderness provides important nesting habitat for golden eagles, kestrels, hawks, great horned owls, long-eared owls, turkey vultures, and hosts a large population of prairie falcons.  Mule deer, elk, and a variety of upland game birds also live in the area.

See also
List of wilderness areas in Nevada
List of U.S. Wilderness Areas
Wilderness Act

References

External links
Far South Egans Wilderness
Far South Egans Wilderness, photos by BLM
"Scientists Voice Their Overwhelming Support for Wilderness Designations in White Pine County, Nevada" by the Wilderness Society

Wilderness areas of Nevada
Protected areas of Nye County, Nevada
Protected areas of White Pine County, Nevada
Protected areas of Lincoln County, Nevada
Bureau of Land Management areas in Nevada
IUCN Category Ib
Protected areas established in 2006
2006 establishments in Nevada